Washington Township is a township in Taylor County, Iowa, USA.

History
Washington Township was established in 1855.

References

Townships in Taylor County, Iowa
Townships in Iowa
Populated places established in 1855
1855 establishments in Iowa